The Silva Bridge is a Pratt pony truss bridge in Puerto Rico which was built in 1897 and was listed on the National Register of Historic Places in 1995.

The Silva Bridge spans the Guanajibo River, the boundary between Guanajibo barrio in Hormigueros and Guanajibo barrio in Cabo Rojo. It is at kilometer 4 of Highway 114.

It was built in the year before the Spanish–American War, and was the site of conflict between Spanish forces and the Americans who invaded Puerto Rico on July 25, 1898. Sniper fire held up American forces under Brigadier General Theodore Schwan who were seeking to go west across the bridge on August 10, 1898, delaying them by about two hours. The snipers were Spanish regulars and Puerto Rican volunteers.

It is Bridge No. 71 mentioned in a review of historic bridges in Puerto Rico. It is a Pratt pony truss bridge built over the River in 1897.

References

External links
 

Cabo Rojo, Puerto Rico
Hormigueros, Puerto Rico
Road bridges on the National Register of Historic Places in Puerto Rico
Bridges completed in 1897
1897 establishments in Puerto Rico
Spanish–American War
Pony truss bridges
Pratt truss bridges